Painted People is a 1924 American silent comedy-drama film directed by Clarence G. Badger and starring Colleen Moore. It was produced and distributed by Associated First National Pictures.

Plot
As described in a review of the film in a film magazine, Ellie Byrne (Moore) and Don Lane (Lyon), chums, living in the poor section of a factory town, go away to make their fortunes. Ellie wishes to become a lady so that she can marry Preston Dutton (Striker), a society chap, and Don becoming infatuated with Stephanie Parrish (Merriam), daughter of a wealthy man. Ellie becomes a leading actress and Don the author of her first play. Ellie refuses Dutton’s suit when she learns he is after her money, and Stephanie returns Don’s engagement ring. Ellie and Don go back to the factory town disillusioned. They realize that they love each other and in reality had not bettered themselves for someone else but for each other.

Cast

Preservation
With no copies of Painted People located in any film archives or collections, it is a lost film.

References

External links

1924 films
American silent feature films
Lost American films
Films directed by Clarence G. Badger
American black-and-white films
1920s English-language films
1924 comedy-drama films
1924 lost films
Lost comedy-drama films
1920s American films
Silent American comedy-drama films